Kushkak (also Romanized as Kūshkak and Koshkak; also known as Koshkak-e Afshārīyeh) is a village in Afshariyeh Rural District, Khorramdasht District, Takestan County, Qazvin Province, Iran. At the 2006 census, its population was 223, in 59 families.

References 

Populated places in Takestan County